Uno is one of the Bissagos Islands off the coast of Guinea-Bissau, in the Atlantic Ocean.

Uno and the Bissagos Islands are part of the Boloma Bijagós Biosphere Reserve, a UNESCO Biosphere Reserve designated in 1996.

Government 
The Uno Sector, part of the Bolama Region, covers Uno and the nearby islands of Eguba, Orango, Unhocomo, Unhocomozinho and Uracane. The sector's population is 6,751 (2009 census).

References

Bolama Region
Bissagos Islands